Ernst Oscar Rosell (3 December 1881 – 26 July 1953) was a Swedish sport shooter who competed in the 1908 Summer Olympics.

In 1908 he won the gold medal in the team running deer, single shots event.

In the 1908 Summer Olympics he also participated in the following events:

 running deer, double shots - eighth place
 running deer, single shots - eleventh place
 1000 yard free rifle - 46th place

References

External links
profile

1881 births
1953 deaths
Swedish male sport shooters
Running target shooters
ISSF rifle shooters
Olympic shooters of Sweden
Shooters at the 1908 Summer Olympics
Olympic gold medalists for Sweden
Olympic medalists in shooting
Medalists at the 1908 Summer Olympics
Sportspeople from Jönköping
19th-century Swedish people
20th-century Swedish people